My Oracle Lives Uptown is the tenth album by British electronic musician and record producer, William Orbit. It was released digitally on 4 May 2009 on Kobalt Digital, as a 12-track limited edition. It was released as a physical CD on 8 June 2009 with 16 tracks. The 16 track version was released as a Studio Master quality digital download and on deluxe Double 180g vinyl by Linn Records.

Track listing (digital version)

Track listing (CD version)

Album info

The album was produced by William Orbit over a period of six years. Many of the tracks on the final CD have been previously available to listen on the artist's website. Contributors to My Oracle Lives Uptown include Laurie Mayer, from Torch Song; "White Night" is a remake, the track having been previously released by Torch Song.

The song "Purdy" has been used in 2007 for Madonna's H&M clothes design campaign.
A CD single for the track "Optical Illusions" has been released with several remixes and a new mix of the song by William Orbit named "Billy Buttons Mix".

The physical release contains a 20-page booklet with art design conceived by William and Laurie Mayer, and put together by his webmaster Richard Shea. Most of the images are photos taken by William himself or Laurie Mayer.

Album Marketing

For marketing the new album Orbit has created a blog on his website in which he weekly posts pictures, information and song downloads. He has been using the microblog service Twitter to spread news, opinions and personal pictures as well.

He has been appearing in several British TV and Radio shows to promote the album.

Internet Leak

In May 2009, a promo version of the album was leaked on the internet. The track list for this promo differs from both the digital and CD versions of the final album.  The version of "Drift So Far" is slower and more ambient than the website version on the final album. "Optical Illusions" (Billy Buttons Version) on the final album is slightly shorter than the promo version and has been subtly remixed. Unlike the final album, the promo includes "Nimbus", which was later released as a free download from William Orbit's blog.

External links
www.williamorbit.com – William's blog.

2009 albums
William Orbit albums
Albums produced by William Orbit